These Are the Vistas was the second studio album released by the jazz trio The Bad Plus, and the band's first album for a major label (Columbia Records). The album was the listening public's first widespread opportunity to hear the band, which Jim Fusilli of the Wall Street Journal called a "jazz power trio with a rock-and-roll heart."  The album features several cover songs: Nirvanas "Smells Like Teen Spirit," Blondies "Heart of Glass," and Aphex Twins "Flim".  In November 2009, NPR's All Songs Considered selected the album as one of the 50 "most important" recordings of the decade.

Production
According to JazzTimes, producer-engineer Tchad Blake, "comes to [jazz] from the world of Los Lobos, Tom Waits and Pearl Jam" and "approaches These Are the Vistas with an ear for acoustic frictions.  His firm but unobtrusive direction showcases the Bad Plus in a way that's somehow both huge-sounding and stripped-down."

Track listing
"Big Eater" (Reid Anderson) – 3:53
"Keep The Bugs Off Your Glass And The Bears Off Your Ass" (David King) – 5:49
"Smells Like Teen Spirit" (Kurt Cobain, Dave Grohl, Krist Novoselic) – 5:57
"Everywhere You Turn" (Anderson) – 4:56
"1972 Bronze Medalist" (King) – 5:20
"Guilty" (Ethan Iverson) – 5:35
"Boo-Wah" (Iverson) – 3:55
"Flim" (Richard D. James) – 4:05
"Heart of Glass" (Deborah Harry, Chris Stein) – 4:47
"Silence Is The Question" (Anderson) – 8:11
"What Love Is This" (Iverson) – 4:07 (European and Japanese bonus track)

Personnel
Ethan Iverson – piano
Reid Anderson – acoustic bass
David King – drums
Tchad Blake – producer

References

The Bad Plus albums
Albums produced by Tchad Blake
Crossover jazz albums
2003 albums